Michael Sterling Eaton is an American multimedia artist, known for his work as a music producer, creative director, filmmaker, clothing designer and photographer. He was born in and raised in Del Mar, California and graduated from Torrey Pines High School. Based in Los Angeles, California, he primarily produces music, as well films and photographs the music and fashion industries.

Eaton's work encompasses many forms of media. It has appeared worldwide throughout many different platforms including global advertising campaigns, political campaigns, magazine editorials and covers, film making, television commercials, artist branding, music videos, music production, film scores & soundtracks, album covers/artwork, fashion shows and photojournalism. His client list includes, American Idol, Arnette, Billabong, Cartoon Network, FUEL TV, Fox Sports, FOX, Grammy Music Foundation, The Grammy Brand, Burton, Kings of Leon, My Chemical Romance, Edward Sharpe and the Magnetic Zeros, Citizen Cope, Mos Def, Stalley, Bilal, The Cool Kids, Scoop DeVille, Damon Dash, Curren$y, Gil Scott-Heron, Vitali Klitschko, Wladimir Klitschko, Hayden Panettiere, The Lafayette Hotel, 11 Mirrors Design Hotel, Nike, Osiris, RCA Records, Sony Records, Surfer Magazine, Surfing Magazine, Surfing Magazine Swimsuit Issue, MTV, and VH1.

Career 
In 2004, Eaton became the first managing editor and photographer for Risen Magazine. While he was at Risen he was responsible for getting celebrities into the magazine, conducting interviews and photographing subjects. The magazine included interviews with artists such as Anthony Kiedis of Red Hot Chili Peppers, Billy Corgan of The Smashing Pumpkins, The Kings of Leon, and Blink 182.

Eaton was chosen to create and design the high-end fashion line The Grammy Brand for The Grammy's 50th anniversary. The Grammy Brand was worn by Coldplay, Alicia Keys, The Roots, Gnarls Barkley, Earth Wind and Fire, The Pussycat Dolls, Linkin Park, and John Legend. In 2009, Eaton directed music videos for Gil Scott-Heron ("Me and The Devil"), Mos Def ("White Drapes"), Talib Kweli, and Curren$y ("Under The Scope").

In 2010, Eaton began working for Wladimir Klitschko, filming and photographing training camps and fights for the heavyweight champion. He also photographed his brother Vitali Klitschko for the last two fights of his boxing career. Vitali retired from boxing and became a political leader in the Ukraine. He continues to use Eaton to photograph his political campaigns. It was also in 2010 that Eaton was contracted by Fox racing for 4 years as a freelance creative director, photographer and consultant.

In 2011, Eaton filmed the singer Bilal and the rapper Common together at an outdoor concert performance in Los Angeles. Using the footage of them onstage and behind the scenes, he created a music video for their studio remake of the 1977 Fela Kuti song "Sorrow, Tears & Blood", which had been recorded for Bilal's unreleased but heavily bootlegged album Love for Sale.

In 2012, Surfing Magazine selected Eaton to direct and shoot the entire Surfing Magazine Swimsuit Issue for that year. It became Surfing Magazine's number one selling swimsuit issue. Later that year, the 11 Mirrors Design Hotel contracted Eaton for creative director and consultant for the 2012 launch of the hotel. In addition to his creative direction and consulting, Eaton gave the hotel its slogan "Reflecting You" and shot the photography for the hotel imagery and advertising campaign. That year, 11 Mirrors won "Best Small Hotel" at The International Hotel Awards. It was awarded the "Best New Hotel" of 2012 by HVS in the luxury category and was TripAdvisor Traveler's Choice Award for Top Hotel in Kyiv and Top Luxury Hotel in Kyiv.

The Lafayette Hotel of San Diego, CA contracted Eaton to be the creative director of the hotel. In addition to his tasks as Creative Director, he directed marketing and shot their advertising campaigns. Eaton recreated the hotel's restaurant Hope 46. He is responsible for the interior design, the art direction as well as the food and cocktail menus. He took the hotel's original blue print drawings designed by Master Architect Frank L. Hope, Jr. and had them turned into wall paper that he had put up onto the walls of the store. Eaton produced and released "Black Widow" the first single from artist Ernie Gaines debut album "Lost In Time". The album features Grammy Award winner Om'Mas Keith, as well as Thundercat (Stephen Bruner) and Miguel Atwood-Ferguson. Eaton also worked with Grammy-nominated music producer Scoop DeVille on the Watercolor Werewolf debut album "Survival". In 2015 Eaton focused more on branding. Eaton was selected by Modern Luxury as Most Influential Entrepreneurs Under 40. Eaton's music group Watercolor Werewolf was selected to perform in Los Angeles among other high-profile acts and artists for The Bernie Sanders "Feel The Bern" campaign. In January 2016, Eaton designed the new Epic Records website and campaign.

Personal life 
In 2006 Eaton married actress Sanoe Lake. They have two children.

References

1978 births
Living people
People from San Diego
American artists